Embassy Group or Embassy Property Developments Pvt. Ltd is a privately-held real estate developer based in Bengaluru, Karnataka, India established in 1993. The group is into real estate development for verticals like commercial, residential, hospitality, industrial warehouse spaces, services, retail and education. The company has developed projects in many Indian cities like Bengaluru, Chennai, Hyderabad, Pune, Coimbatore, Trivandrum etc. and two countries abroad (Serbia and Malaysia). Embassy Group is headed by Jitu Virwani, Chairman & Managing Director of the group. Embassy also operates a real estate investment trust (REIT), called Embassy Office Parks REIT. Embassy Office Parks is the first listed REIT in India and the Asia's largest office REIT by area.

Projects

Commercial

Manyata Embassy Business Park, Bengaluru
Embassy Tech Zone, Pune

References

External links 
 Official website

 
Private equity firms
Venture capital firms of India
Indian companies established in 1993
Real estate companies of India
Companies based in Bangalore
Warburg Pincus companies
1993 establishments in Karnataka
Real estate companies established in 1993